Antonio "Tony" Pineda Jr. was a National Commander of the Civil Air Patrol. The Civil Air Patrol removed Pineda as national commander after investigating complaints that another patrol member took Air Force tests for him.

Civil Air Patrol

Background
He began his Civil Air Patrol career as a member of the West Broward Composite Squadron in 1988. Pineda completed all levels of the CAP professional development program, including the Paul Garber, Grover Loening, Charles Yeager Aerospace Education and Gill Robb Wilson awards. He attended both the Southeast Region Staff College and the National Staff College. He is also a graduate of the National Commanders Course.

Timeline
1988-1989: Joined CAP 
1989-1996: Group commander, South Florida
1996-1998: Florida Wing vice commander
1998-2001: Florida Wing commander
2001-2004: Southeast Region commander
2004-2005; National Vice commander
2005-2007: National Commander of the Civil Air Patrol — Removed by the Board of Governors for misconduct and stripped of his rank.

Controversy
In 2007 the Civil Air Patrol Board of Governors voted to and removed Pineda, owing to allegations that he had his subordinates take his exams for him (for courses on security and leadership, among others). The Board also stripped him of his rank. The accusations were investigated & confirmed in an Inspector General report.

Others

Ranger Corps
He subsequently created his own volunteer organization, the short lived and now defunct U.S. Ranger Corps, in which he gave himself the title of Lt. Gen.

Police

Pineda began his professional career in 1972 as a police officer and later a detective with the Hollywood, FL Police Department.

References

Living people
Florida International University alumni
Miami Dade College alumni
National Commanders of the Civil Air Patrol
People from Hollywood, Florida
Year of birth missing (living people)
Place of birth missing (living people)